Your Majesty is a style of address.

Your Majesty may also refer to:
 Your Majesty (album), a 2002 album by indie rock band The Anniversary
 Your Majesty (horse), a racehorse